Kabong is a district, in Betong Division, Sarawak, Malaysia.

Transport

Local Bus

References